Kurt Schirra (13 September 1931 – 17 May 1983) was a German boxer. He competed in the men's featherweight event at the 1952 Summer Olympics, representing Saar.

References

External links
 

1931 births
1983 deaths
German male boxers
Olympic boxers of Saar
Boxers at the 1952 Summer Olympics
People from Völklingen
Featherweight boxers
Sportspeople from Saarland